Route 17, commonly known as the Stewart Highway, is  long and runs from the Canada–US border in Saint-Leonard to Route 11 in Glencoe near Campbellton. Saint-Quentin and Kedgwick are other towns along the route. With the exception of those towns, the highway runs almost entirely through sparsely populated forest land. It is the only highway connecting northwestern New Brunswick with the province's north shore.   It is named in honour of David A. Stewart.

History 

Over several decades, Route 17 has received several upgrades, and new sections of road built, to improve safety. These upgrades have been designed to meet present-day standards, including flatter grades, creation of more passing lanes, upgrades to guard rail requirements and increased shoulder widths. Some examples of these, have been the new alignments of the highway north of Saint-Leonard, or the bypassing of Dawsonville, west of Campbellton.

Route description 
Route 17's northern terminus is at a T intersection with Route 11 in Glencoe  (Route 17 is a continuation of the Route 11 direct right of way.) It runs southwesterly from there,    passing through the communities of Glen Levit, and Squaw Cap. Between the two communities, is a new section of highway, opened in the early 2000s bypassing Dawsonville, and adhering to modern highway standards.

After roughly 19 kilometres, Route 17 crosses the Upsalquitch River, and passes through Robinsonville, before climbing Upsalquitch Hill. With an 11% grade, it is the steepest arterial highway grade in the province.

Atop of the hill, the road passes through Glenwood. Southwest of Glenwood, the highway descends and then climbs  back up Adams Gulch, while passing through the community of the same name. After running west in the wilderness for almost 10 kilometres, Route 17 passes through Menneval, then Saint-Jean-Baptiste, before heading through Kedgwick, where there is a sharp 90 degree turn. Once past Kedgwick, Route 17 turns south, due for the town of Saint-Quentin.

After Saint-Quentin, the highway heads in a southwesterly manner once more and heads through wilderness, with only J.D. Irving's Sawmill in Veneer, in that stretch of woods. Approximately 50 kilometres later, Route 17 hits civilization in Saint-Leonard-Parent, nearing its southern terminus. Roughly 10 kilometres to the southwest, the highway reaches the town of Saint-Leonard. Passing under the Trans-Canada Highway, Route 17 continues to the Canada–United States border, where it reaches it southern terminus.

The speed limit varies throughout the route, from 50 km/h in Kedgwick and Saint-Quentin, to 90 km/h, on many rural and uninhabited stretches.

Major intersections

Gallery

See also
List of New Brunswick provincial highways

References

New Brunswick provincial highways
Roads in Madawaska County, New Brunswick
Roads in Victoria County, New Brunswick
Roads in Restigouche County, New Brunswick